Wild Flower' is an album by saxophonist Houston Person recorded in 1977 and released on the Muse label.

Reception

Allmusic awarded the album 4 stars noting that "Person never received much publicity but has been near the top of his field since the late '60s. His basic, swinging approach has resulted in a consistent string of rewarding and accessible albums... Worth searching for".

Track listing 
 "Preachin' and Teachin'" (Sonny Phillips) - 7:40  
 "Dameron" (Tadd Dameron) - 7:30  
 "Wildflower" (Doug Edwards, Dave Richardson) - 6:50  
 "Ain't Misbehavin'" (Fats Waller, Harry Brooks, Andy Razaf) -  6:00
 "My Romance" (Lorenz Hart, Richard Rodgers) - 5:30

Personnel 
Houston Person - tenor saxophone 
Bill Hardman - trumpet
Jimmy Ponder - guitar
Sonny Phillips - organ
Idris Muhammad - drums
Larry Killan - congas, percussion

References 

Houston Person albums
1978 albums
Muse Records albums
Albums recorded at Van Gelder Studio